Álvaro Daniel Méndez Josa (born 6 April 1976 in Montevideo) is a Uruguayan footballer. He currently plays for Esporte Clube São José.

On 15 January 2011, he was transferred to Esporte Clube São José of Brazil.

Career honours
Finnish Championship 1996

References

External links
 Player profile 

Living people
1976 births
Uruguayan footballers
Uruguayan expatriate footballers
Association football forwards
Veikkausliiga players
Rampla Juniors players
Sud América players
FC Jazz players
Expatriate footballers in Brazil
Expatriate footballers in Finland